The First Winter Campaign was a campaign by the army of the Ukrainian People's Republic (UPR) against Bolshevik forces in Ukraine during the Ukrainian-Soviet War. It began on December 6, 1919, and lasted until May 6, 1920. The main task of the Winter Campaign was to maintain the presence of the Ukrainian People's Army (UPA) on Ukrainian territory and in enemy territory, through guerrilla action. At the end of November 1919, the remnants of the UPA were surrounded (Lyubar-Chortoria-Myropil). The Galician Army, due to Petliura's appeasement with the Poles (which some researchers interpret as treacherous), was forced to join General Denikin's Russian Volunteer Army after November 6, 1919. The Ukrainian People's Army troops were surrounded by three enemy armies — the Red Army, Volunteer Army and Polish Army (with which reconciliation was achieved at that time); in addition, Ukrainian units suffered from the typhus epidemic. On December 6, 1919, at a military meeting in Nova Chortoria, it was finally decided to carry out a winter campaign by units of the UPR and the rear of the Volunteer Army. About 5,000 people took part in the campaign against the Red and Volunteer Armies. However, the composition of the combat-ready units numbered 2,000 bayonets, 1,000 sabers and 14 guns. 

The leader of the Ukrainian forces was General Mykhailo Omelianovych-Pavlenko.

Background
The First World War saw tremendous upheaval in Ukraine, and in the short period between the spring of 1917 and late 1919, three governments had taken shape in the capital, Kyiv. However, the political situation was difficult because of the international pressure from Poland, and especially the Bolsheviks.

By late 1919, it became clear that conventional warfare against Bolshevik forces in Ukraine had become impossible, so the Ukrainian People's Republic had decided to demobilize its military and conduct partisan warfare behind Bolshevik lines.

Participating Units
There were three main Ukrainian units - they were renamed divisions in February 1920. "Zaporizhia", commanded by General Andrii Huly-Hulenko; "Kyiv", commanded by General Yurii Tiutiunnyk; and "Volhynia", commanded by General Oleksander Zahrodsky. The was chief of staff during the campaign was Andriy Dolud.

Main Battles

During the entire raid, 2,500 kilometers were covered by the enemy, more than 50 successful battles were fought.

Because of the nature of the campaign, the armies covered much territory. Originally the main theater of war was the Yelizavetgrad region, but as the Bolshevik-Denikin front moved south, so did the campaign.

The route of the First Winter Campaign passed through the territories of the present Zhytomyr (Romaniv, Lyubar, Chudniv districts), Kyiv (Tetiiv district), Cherkasy (almost all districts), Kirovohrad (almost all districts), Mykolaiv (Vradiyiv, Domaniv, Voznesensky, Novobugsky, Kazan districts), Odessa (Nikolaev, Lyubashivsky, Ananiyevsky, Baltic districts), Vinnytsia (in 1919 - Khmilnytsky, Kalynivsky, Kozyatynsky, Lipovetsky, Pogrebyshchensky, Orativsky, the end of the campaign - Chechelnytsky, Bershadsky, Trostya , Tomashpilsky, Yampilsky, Tulchinsky, Pishchansky districts).

The main battles of the First Winter Campaign took place at Lypovets, Zhashkiv, Uman, Kaniv, Cherkasy, Smila, Zolotonosha, Olviopol, Holovanivsk, Haisyn, Voznesensk, Ananiv, and Balta.

Aftermath 
According to military historians, the First Winter Campaign of the Army of the Ukrainian People's Republic is a significant page in the period of the Ukrainian Revolution (1917-1921), for the first time, the Ukrainian Army successfully used guerrilla methods to fight numerous enemies. All returning Winter Campaign participants were awarded the Order of the Iron Cross of the Ukrainian People's Republic.

See also
Second Winter Campaign

References

Battles of the Ukrainian–Soviet War
1919 in Ukraine
1920 in Ukraine
Conflicts in 1919
Conflicts in 1920